MACS J0647.7+7015 is a galaxy cluster with a redshift z = 0.592, located at J2000.0 right ascension  declination . It lies between the Big Dipper and Little Dipper in the constellation Camelopardalis. It is part of a sample of 12 extreme galaxy clusters at z > 0.5 discovered by the MAssive Cluster Survey (MACS).

During 2012 the galaxy cluster was announced as gravitationally lensing the most distant galaxy (MACS0647-JD), then ever imaged (z = 11).

References

External links
 

Galaxy clusters
Camelopardalis (constellation)